The Horse Caves of Granby, Massachusetts are a geological feature in the Holyoke Range.  These caves are really ledges. They are found along the New England National Scenic Trail to the east of the summit of Mount Norwottuck.

According to legend, some of the men fighting with Daniel Shays in Shays' Rebellion hid out in the Horse Caves after their defeat at the hands of the Massachusetts militia.

References

Caves of Massachusetts
Landforms of Hampshire County, Massachusetts
Granby, Massachusetts